Filippo Maria Campeggi (1512–1584) was a Roman Catholic prelate who served as Bishop of Feltre (1559–1584).

Biography
Filippo Maria Campeggi was born in 1512 in Bologna, Italy.
On 16 Apr 1546, he was appointed during the papacy of Pope Paul III as Coadjutor Bishop of Feltre.
On 17 Apr 1559, he succeeded to the bishopric.
On 30 Jul 1559, he was consecrated bishop by Giovanni Campeggi, Bishop of Bologna, with Pierdonato Cesi (seniore), Bishop of Narni, and Salvatore Pacini, Bishop of Chiusi, serving as co-consecrators. 
He served as Bishop of Feltre until his death on 9 Apr 1584 in Feltre, Italy.

References

External links and additional sources
 (for Chronology of Bishops) 
 (for Chronology of Bishops)  

16th-century Italian Roman Catholic bishops
Bishops appointed by Pope Paul III
1512 births
1584 deaths